Peter Rowan Williams (born 20 June 1968) is a South African former swimmer who set a world record in the 50 metre freestyle. He placed third in the 50 metre freestyle at the 1994 Commonwealth Games, and fourth at the 1992 Summer Olympics. At the Olympics he also competed on the South African teams in 4×100 metre freestyle relay and 4×100 metre medley relay, but without reaching the final.

See also
 List of Commonwealth Games medallists in swimming (men)
 World record progression 50 metres freestyle

References

Profile

1968 births
Living people
South African male swimmers
Swimmers at the 1992 Summer Olympics
Olympic swimmers of South Africa
Commonwealth Games bronze medallists for South Africa
Swimmers at the 1994 Commonwealth Games
Commonwealth Games medallists in swimming
African Games medalists in swimming
African Games gold medalists for South Africa
Competitors at the 1995 All-Africa Games
Medallists at the 1994 Commonwealth Games